Ursina Lardi (born 19 December 1970, in Samedan) is a Swiss actress, best known for playing the baroness, Marie-Louise in The White Ribbon.
Lardi studied acting at the Academy of Performing Arts Ernst Busch in Berlin and played at various theatres in Germany, and movies, among them Akte Grüninger and Marmorera.

Selected filmography
  (2001)
  (2016, TV film)
 Shock Waves – First Name: Mathieu (2018)
 The Girl and the Spider (2021)

References

External links
 

1970 births
Living people
People from Maloja District
Ernst Busch Academy of Dramatic Arts alumni
Swiss film actresses
Swiss stage actresses
Swiss television actresses